Lisa Su (born 7 November 1969) is an American business executive and electrical engineer, who is the president, chief executive officer and chair of AMD. Early in her career, Su worked at Texas Instruments, IBM, and Freescale Semiconductor in engineering and management positions. She is known for her work developing silicon-on-insulator semiconductor manufacturing technologies and more efficient semiconductor chips during her time as vice president of IBM's Semiconductor Research and Development Center.

Su was appointed president and CEO of AMD in October 2014, after joining the company in 2012 and holding roles such as senior vice president of AMD's global business units and chief operating officer. She currently serves on the boards of Cisco Systems, Global Semiconductor Alliance and the U.S. Semiconductor Industry Association, and is a fellow of the Institute of Electrical and Electronics Engineers (IEEE). Recognized with a number of awards and accolades, she was named Executive of the Year by EE Times in 2014 and one of the World's Greatest Leaders in 2017 by Fortune. She became the first woman to receive the IEEE Robert Noyce Medal in 2021.

Early life and education
Lisa Tzwu-Fang Su was born in November of 1969 in Tainan, Taiwan. She was born in a Taiwanese Hokkien speaking family. She immigrated to the United States at the age of 3 with her parents Su Chun-hwai (蘇春槐) and Sandy Lo (羅淑雅).  Both she and her brother were encouraged to study math and science as children.  When she was seven, her father – a retired statistician – began quizzing her on multiplication tables. Her mother, an accountant who later became an entrepreneur, introduced her to business concepts.  At a young age, Su aspired to be an engineer, explaining "I just had a great curiosity about how things worked". When she was 10, she began taking apart and then fixing her brother's remote control cars, and she owned her first computer in junior high school, an Apple II. She attended the Bronx High School of Science in New York City, graduating in 1986.

Su began attending the Massachusetts Institute of Technology (MIT) in the fall of 1986, intending to major in either electrical engineering or computer science. She settled on electrical engineering, recollecting that it seemed like the most difficult major. During her freshman year she worked as an undergrad research assistant "manufacturing test silicon wafers for graduate students" through the Undergraduate Research Opportunities Program (UROP). The project, as well as her summer jobs at Analog Devices, fueled her interest in semiconductors. She remained focused on the topic for the remainder of her education, spending much of her time in labs designing and adjusting products. After earning her bachelor's degree in electrical engineering, she obtained her master's degree from MIT in 1991. From 1990 to 1994 she studied for her PhD  under MIT advisor Dimitri Antoniadis. MIT Technology Review reports that as a doctoral candidate, Su was "one of the first researchers to look into silicon-on-insulator (SOI) technology, a then unproven technique for increasing transistors' efficiency by building them atop layers of an insulating material".  She graduated with her PhD in electrical engineering from MIT in 1994. Her PhD thesis was titled Extreme-submicrometer silicon-on-insulator (SOI) MOSFETs.

Career

1994–1999: Texas Instruments and IBM R&D
In June 1994, Su became a member of the technical staff at Texas Instruments, working in the company's Semiconductor Process and Device Center (SPDC) until February 1995. That month, IBM hired Su as a research staff member specializing in device physics, and she was appointed vice president of IBM's semiconductor research and development center.  During her time at IBM, Su played a "critical role" in developing the "recipe" to make copper connections work with semiconductor chips instead of aluminum, "solving the problem of preventing copper impurities from contaminating the devices during production". Working with various IBM design teams on the details of the device, Su explained, "my specialty was not in copper, but I migrated to where the problems were". The copper technology was launched in 1998, resulting in new industry standards and chips that were up to 20% faster than the conventional versions.

2000–2007: IBM Emerging Products division
In 2000, Su was given a year-long assignment as the technical assistant for Lou Gerstner, IBM's CEO. She subsequently took on the role of director of emerging projects, stating that "I was basically director of myself – there was no one else in the group". As head and founder of IBM's Emerging Products division, she ran a startup company and soon hired 10 employees to focus on biochips and "low-power and broadband semiconductors". Their first product was a microprocessor that improved battery life in phones and other handheld devices. MIT Technology Review named her a "Top Innovator Under 35" in 2001, in part due to her work with Emerging Products.  Also through the division, she represented IBM in a collaboration to create next-generation chips with Sony and Toshiba. Ken Kutaragi charged the collaboration with "improving the performance of game machine processors by a factor of 1,000", and Su's team eventually came up with the idea for a nine-processor chip, which later became the Cell microprocessor used to power devices such as the Sony PlayStation 3. As of 2006, she continued to serve as vice president of the semiconductor research and development center at IBM, holding the role until May 2007.

2007–2011: Freescale Semiconductor
Su joined Freescale Semiconductor in June 2007 as chief technology officer (CTO), heading the company's research and development until August 2009. From September 2008 until December 2011, she served as senior vice president and general manager of Freescale's networking and multimedia group, and was responsible for global strategy, marketing, and engineering for the company's embedded communications and applications processor business. As head of the company's networking-chip business, EE Times credited her with helping Freescale get "its house in order", with the company filing for an IPO in 2011.

2012–2014: AMD appointments
Su became senior vice president and general manager at AMD in January 2012, overseeing the company's global business units and the "end-to-end business execution" of AMD's products. Over the next two years she "played a prominent role" in pushing the company to diversify beyond the PC market, including working with Microsoft and Sony to place AMD chips in Xbox One and PS4 game consoles.

On 8 October 2014, AMD announced Su's appointment to president and CEO, replacing Rory Read. Su stated that her plan for the company involved focusing on making the "right technology investments", streamlining the product line, and continuing to diversify, also asserting that she wanted to "simplify" the company and accelerate the development of new technology. A number of analysts praised the appointment due to Su's credentials, noting AMD was seeking growth in product areas where Su had "extensive experience".

2015–2016: AMD diversification

When Su joined AMD in 2012, about 10 percent of sales came from non-PC products. By February 2015, roughly 40 percent of AMD's sales came from non-PC markets, such as video game consoles and embedded devices. In May 2015, Su and other AMD executives presented a long-term strategy for the company to focus on developing high-performance computing and graphics technologies for three growth areas: gaming, datacenter, and "immersive platforms" markets.

In January 2016, Su announced that AMD was working on new FinFET-based chips to create a new line of microprocessors, products, accelerated processing units (APUs), graphics chips, and semi-custom chip designs for unreleased video game consoles. AMD's share value spiked in July 2016, when AMD reported strong revenue growth. Fortune attributed the "impressive" statistic to Su, stating she "continues to execute on her comeback plan ... key gains in graphics and video gaming console chips have boosted results as well as a savvy deal to license server chip designs in China".

2017–present: Ryzen

After the initial launch of Zen chips in quarter two 2017, AMD's percentage of the CPU market share surged to nearly 11%. Ryzen CPUs have received favorable reviews from a variety of news outlets, specifically highlighting their high thread counts at prices drastically lower than those of Intel's, especially in the high-performance computing market with AMD's Ryzen Threadripper line of workstation processors. Su is the first woman ever to top The Associated Press’ annual survey of CEO compensation: Her 2019 pay package was valued at $58.5 million.

In February 2022, Su became Chair of AMD after completing a reported $49 billion acquisition of FPGA and programmable systems on chip maker Xilinx.

Directorships and authorship
She currently serves on the boards of Analog Devices, Cisco Systems, Inc., the Global Semiconductor Alliance, and the U.S. Semiconductor Industry Association. As of 2016 she has published over forty technical articles and coauthored a book chapter discussing next-generation consumer electronics.

Awards and honors 

Su has been recognized with a number of awards throughout her career. In 2002 she was selected as one of the "Top 100 Young Innovators" by MIT Technology Review,  and the following year the YWCA gave her an award for outstanding achievement in business. In 2009, Su was named a fellow of the Institute of Electrical and Electronics Engineers (IEEE), having published more than 40 technical articles. Su was named "2014 Executive of the Year" at the EE Times and EDN 2014 ACE Awards.

In 2015, SFGate nominated her for their inaugural Visionary of the Year award, which "salutes leaders who strive to make the world a better place and drive social and economic change by employing new, innovative business models and practices".

In 2016, she was named one of the "50 Most Powerful Women in Technology" by the National Diversity Council and "Outstanding 50 Asian Americans in Business" with the Pinnacle Award by the Asia American Business Development Center.

In 2017, Su was named "People to Watch" by HPCWire, "Top Ranked Semiconductor CEO", by Institutional Investor Magazine and "World's Greatest Leaders" by Fortune. Su was again named one of the "50 Most Powerful Women in Technology" by the National Diversity Council.

In 2018, Su received the UPWARD "Women of the Year Award", "Lifetime Achievement Award" from the Greater Austin Asian Chamber, elected to the National Academy of Engineering, Fortune's #6 "Businessperson of the Year", Global Semiconductor Alliance  "Dr. Morris Chang Exemplary Leadership Award", and Forbes''' America's Top 50 Women In Tech.  She was also appointed as Board of Directors Chair of the Global Semiconductor Alliance.

In 2019, Su was named one of “The World’s Best CEO of 2019” by Barron's, Fortune's #44 "Most Powerful Women in Business", Harvard Business Review's #26 "The Best-Performing CEOs in the World", and Bloomberg Businessweek "The Bloomberg 50".

Su was the highest-paid CEO for 2019 of any company on the S&P 500 index of the 500 largest publicly-traded U.S. companies. The annual review, published by A.P. and Equilar since 2011, reported that Su received $58.5 million in 2019. The figure is mainly due to a one-off stock reward.

She was the 2020 recipient of the Semiconductor Industry Association's Robert N. Noyce Award. Also in 2020, she was elected to the American Academy of Arts and Sciences. She was the 2020 Technical Leadership Abie Award Winner. She was the recipient of the Spirit of Silicon Valley Lifetime Achievement Award from the Silicon Valley Leadership Group. She was also ranked as #2 on the Fortune Business Person of The Year.

In 2021 Su was named as a Member of the U.S. President's Council of Advisors on Science and Technology, and inducted into the Women in Technology Hall of Fame. Su was subsequently awarded the IEEE Robert N. Noyce Medal, becoming the first woman to receive this prize, and named as #49 on the Forbes 100 Most Powerful Women, credited for the 25-fold increase to AMD's stock since she became CEO in 2014. In 2022 Su was awarded the International Peace Honors Honoree "for her achievements in revolutionizing high performance computing, the donation of supercomputing power for infectious disease research, and inspiring people from all backgrounds to pursue careers in STEM"''.

In 2022, MIT named its new building 12, dedicated for nanotechnology research, under her name.

Personal life
Su and her husband Dan are based in Austin, Texas. Su and Nvidia co-founder and CEO Jen-Hsun Huang have been described as "distant relatives" according to Su.

See also

List of chief executive officers
List of IBM alumni
List of Massachusetts Institute of Technology alumni
List of women CEOs of Fortune 500 companies
List of notable people from Tainan

References

External links

Lisa Su at AMD

Businesspeople from Tainan
AMD people
Living people
20th-century American engineers
21st-century American businesspeople
21st-century American engineers
American corporate directors
Women corporate executives
American women engineers
American technology chief executives
American computer businesspeople
IBM employees
American women chief executives
American electrical engineers
Taiwanese emigrants to the United States
Taiwanese people of Hoklo descent
1969 births
Fellow Members of the IEEE
Fellows of the American Academy of Arts and Sciences
MIT School of Engineering alumni
The Bronx High School of Science alumni
21st-century American businesswomen
20th-century American women
Women electrical engineers